Jessica James and the Outlaws was a 1960s American girl vocal trio. The group of Bernadette Carroll, Denise Ferri and Peggy Santiglia recorded singles under their own name and also sang backing for singers such as Frankie Valli.

The girls were recorded by producers including Charlie Calello, Herb Bernstein, Bob Crewe and Bob Gaudio.

Members
Bernadette Carroll (June 21, 1945 – October 5, 2018)
Denise Ferri (June 2, 1944 – October 29, 2020)
Peggy Santiglia (born May 4, 1944)

Discography
"Give Her Up, Baby", B-side "Come Closer"
"We'll Be Makin' Out", B-side "Lucky Day"
"Blue Skies"
"Dixie" (released under pseudonym Tiffany Michele)

Backing
Frankie Valli – "You're Ready Now"
Frankie Valli – "Cry For Me"
Lou Christie – "Lightnin' Strikes"
Lou Christie – "Rhapsody in the Rain"
Lou Christie Pepsi-Cola commercial

References

American girl groups